4D-Jam is a Japanese R&B and soul music unit under the Giza Studio label active in 1998–2002. In 2014, they came back from 12-year hiatus under indies label Con4Tunes.

Members
Maho Furukawa (ふるかわ♥魔法)) – vocalist, lyricist
Kenji Shiojiri (シオジリケンジ) – leader, vocalist, composer, lyricist, arranger
Hiromu Nakao (中尾弘)) – arranger
E:mju – DJ
Mirai & Nozomi – Dancers

History
The formation of band began in 1996 with Kenji and Hiromu together.

In September 1998, as a duo unit they released analog single Finger under indies R&B label Styling Records. In the same month, during music television program's audition Hip Hop performing Minnie Riperton's Lovin' You. Soon after, she joined 4D-Jam as a main vocalist and become Maho's solo project.

In March 1999, as a trio unit they released a first indies single Taiyou no Nai Asa Tsuki no Nai Yoru under indies label Garage Indies Zapping Association. One month later in April, they released the major single Cocoro. During the production of the second single, dancers Mirani and Nozomi left the unit, while DJ E:mju joined 4D-Jam. In June, Kenji was involved with music production as arranger for Zard's single Sekai wa Kitto Mirai no Naka along with Hirohito Furui and Yuuichirou Iwai from New Cinema Tokage. In the same month, they released their first media song city of tracks which was used as ending theme for the DirecTV program Matsuo Kiyoshi Teki Ongaku Seikatsu. In August, they released major album City of Tracks, however the album didn't enter the Oricon Weekly Charts. In October, Kenji was involved once more with Zard music production as composer and arranger of the single Itai Kurai Kimi ga Afureteiru yo; Maho and Hiromu were involved as well as chorus members. In November, their fourth single Ma Life was commercially used as an opening theme for the Tokyo Broadcasting System Television program Kyaeen: Kanpei no Megami no Shinsou.

In January 2000, Maho was involved with music production as a chorus member in Rumania Montevideo's second studio album Girl, Girl, Boy, Girl, Boy. In March 2000, one year after major debut, their fourth single Wondering Hands had become their first anime song for the television series Monster Rancher. After the release of the single B Original, E:mju left the unit. In July, they released their second and final studio album Come Jam Space. It was their first and only work which reached rank No. 89 in the Oricon Weekly Charts, charting for two weeks and selling a total of 5,490 copies. In August, Maho was involved with the music production as a chorus member in the Rumania Montevideo single Start All Over Again.

In April 2001, Maho was involved with music production as a chorus member in The Tambourines debut single Easy game. In May 2001, they released their final single Big Good Lovin'''. The single was included in Giza Studio's compilation album Giza Studio Masterpiece Blend 2001. In June, Kenji provided music for singer-songwriter Miki Matsuhashi's debut single Time Stand Still. In August, Maho provided chorus support for the Mai Kuraki single Can't Forget Your Love.

In January 2002, Maho provided chorus support for Mai Kuraki's single Winter Bells. In October 2002, the unit entered into hiatus without announcement. The whereabouts of Hiromu were unknown.

In 2013, the unit came back from hiatus with Maho as lead vocalist and Kenji as composer and arranger and under indies label Con4Tunes. In 2014, they released digital single Music and third studio album S・S・S〜Soul Searchin’ System''.

Discography

Singles

Studio album

Magazine appearances
From Music Freak Magazine:
Vol.52 1999/March
Vol.53 1999/April
Vol.55 1999/June
Vol.57 1999/August
Vol.60 1999/November
Vol.63 2000/February
Vol.66 2000/May
Vol.67 2000/June
Vol.68 2000/July
Vol.69 2000/August
Vol.73 2000/December
Vol.78 2001/May

From J Groove Music:
Vol.9 2001/July

References

External links
 

Being Inc. artists
Anime musicians
Musical groups established in 1998
Musical groups disestablished in 2002